Elena Georgescu ( Nedelcu, born 10 April 1964 in Bucharest) is a Romanian coxswain who has won five Olympic medals in the women's eight event. She competed until 1991 under her maiden name.

See also
 List of multiple Olympic medalists in one event

References

External links
 
 
 
 
 
 

1964 births
Living people
Romanian female rowers
Coxswains (rowing)
Rowers at the 1992 Summer Olympics
Rowers at the 1996 Summer Olympics
Rowers at the 2000 Summer Olympics
Rowers at the 2004 Summer Olympics
Rowers at the 2008 Summer Olympics
Olympic rowers of Romania
Olympic gold medalists for Romania
Olympic silver medalists for Romania
Olympic bronze medalists for Romania
Sportspeople from Bucharest
Place of birth missing (living people)
Olympic medalists in rowing
Medalists at the 2008 Summer Olympics
Medalists at the 2004 Summer Olympics
World Rowing Championships medalists for Romania
Medalists at the 2000 Summer Olympics
Medalists at the 1996 Summer Olympics
Medalists at the 1992 Summer Olympics
European Rowing Championships medalists
20th-century Romanian women
21st-century Romanian women